Missing years may refer to:

 Missing years (Jewish calendar), a chronological discrepancy between Rabbinic chronologists for the destruction of the First Temple in 423 BCE (3338 AM) or 403 BCE (3358 AM) and the modern secular dating for it in 587 BCE
 Unknown years of Jesus, also known as the missing years, an 18-year period of his life that is not documented in the Bible
 Intertestamental period, the period between the Old and New Testaments of the Bible
 Missing Years (album), a 2007 album by Little Texas or its title track
 The Missing Years (album), a 1991 album by John Prine
 The Thorn Birds: The Missing Years, a 1996 miniseries
 I Know My First Name Is Steven (The Missing Years), a 1989 miniseries about Steven Stayner

See also
 Years of potential life lost, a measure of how long a person could have lived if not for a premature death 
 Dark Ages (historiography)